Edward Michener (August 18, 1869 – June 16, 1947) was a politician from Alberta, Canada. He served as a member of the Legislative Assembly of Alberta and senator from Alberta.

Early life
Edward Michener was born on August 18, 1867, to Jacob and Eliza Michener in Tintern, Ontario. He was educated at St. Catharines Collegiate Institute and post-secondary studies at Victoria University, University of Toronto and Wesley College. He was married to Mary E. Roland on September 15, 1897, and together had four sons and four daughters. Michener's son Roland Michener served as Governor General of Canada.

Political life
Michener was acclaimed as mayor of Red Deer, District of Alberta, in the 1904 mayoral race. He held that position for two terms until 1906.

Michener was elected as an independent in the 1909 Alberta election. In 1910 after Richard Bennett resigned to run for the House of Commons of Canada, he crossed the floor to join the Conservatives. He became Leader of the Official Opposition in Alberta and leader of the Alberta Conservative party.

Prime Minister Robert Borden advised the appointment of Michener to the Senate of Canada in 1918.

Michener died on June 16, 1947, in Ottawa

References

External links

The Michener Institute
Edward Michener exposes the AGT scandal
City of Red Deer Mayoralty  elections 1901 - 2004

1869 births
1947 deaths
Independent Alberta MLAs
Leaders of the Progressive Conservative Association of Alberta
Progressive Conservative Association of Alberta MLAs
Canadian senators from Alberta
Conservative Party of Canada (1867–1942) senators
Canadian people of German descent
Mayors of Red Deer, Alberta
20th-century Canadian politicians